"Dark Crisis" (later called "Dark Crisis on Infinite Earths") is a 2022 comic book storyline published by DC Comics, comprising an eponymous central mini-series by writer Joshua Williamson and artist Daniel Sampere, and a number of tie-in books. The event received critical acclaim, with critics praising Williamson's writing, inclusion of characters, art, story, and action. The conclusion of the series will lead into Dawn of DC in 2023.

Plot

Prelude
Darkseid reveals to his Apokoliptian Elites his knowledge of the Great Darkness, of which he is planning to take control, and his plan to crack the Omniverse. After escaping from Darkseid, Barry Allen runs aimlessly into the ruin of Multiverse-2 where he meets Pariah, who imprisoned him in an alternate reality.

Doctor Multiverse from Earth-8 had not received contact from Machinehead after his negotiation with Darkseid while planning the crack the multiverse. Justice League Incarnate, led by Calvin Ellis, decided to rescue the Flash until they got separated from the Parademon armies attacking their headquarters and confronting other multiversal threats. When Doctor Multiverse touches the crack, she learns a shocking history and convinced the heroes to let Darkseid win.

She reveals to the heroes and Darkseid that the Great Darkness was responsible for causing multiple catastrophic events because of its desire to end all things. During the birth of the multiverse, the Great Darkness declares war against the Light in an attempt to conquer it. The Great Darkness took possession of the Anti-Monitor as its champion while facing off against the Light's champion, the Monitor who summons the heroes to stop Anti-montor's goal resulting in the obliteration of the entire multiverse into a single universe which weakens the Light in the process. As the Darkness attempted to regain control, the Swamp Thing successfully brokered the truce with the Light forcing it to retreat into slumber. However, the Darkness has other plans as it continues to exert its influence by possessing Magog, the Anti-Life Entity, Extant, Superboy-Prime, and Mister Mind, resulting to the creation of 52 Earths. When the Multiverse of 52 Earths was created, the truce was broken allowing the Darkness to reawaken as it continuously spread across the multiverse, which forces the Monitors to contain 52 piles of Earths from collapsing each other. During Final Crisis, Darkseid, who was one of the few beings aware of its existence, had planned to conquer Earth-0 by altering the prophecy and maintaining the possession of the Anti-Life equation to lure the Darkness so that he might take control of entire multiverse. His plan succeeded but at the cost of his life. When Superman activates the Miracle Machine to heal the fabric of the universe, the Darkness reveals itself as it took control of a fallen monitor Mandrakk but was later defeated when his son Nix Uotan summons the entire heroes to kill it. This enrages the Darkness believing that the heroes of the multiverse are much of a greater threat than other powerful beings such as Darkseid. As Darkness continually spread its influence further across the multiverse, it encounters a quantum life-form and manipulates him into altering timelines and history from the Heroes of Earth-0. During Justice League Incarnate's confrontation with the Gentry, the primordial entity known as Empty Hand was created out of existence as Darkness' right hand caused by its truce with the Light. This enables Empty Hand to summon his Gentry by conquering Earth-7, possess Nix Uotan, and create the Oblivion Machine to undo the wish of the Miracle Machine. During the Metal Wars, Darkness summons the bat demon Barbatos as its avatar and the group of Dark Knights as its pawn to sink Earth-0 into blackness by revealing the unknown horrors of the Dark Multiverses. Despite Barbatos' failure and Perpetua's escape from the Source Wall, the Darkest Knight ascended to power by taking over the Multiverse and devastated other Earths until he was defeated by Wonder Woman allowing the Hands to restore Perpetua's actions and recreate an omniverse, which Earth-0 is no longer the center of it. Doctor Multiverse then reveals Darkseid's plan into taking control of the Great Darkness after obtaining his power on Earth-Omega, killing the Quintessence, and cracking open the Omniverse, which the heroes thwarted his plans. Doctor Multiverse believed that the only way to defeat The Great Darkness is to let Darkseid win.

The heroes disapprove of this while Darkseid reveals his first plan to control the Darkness is to declare war on Earth-7 and defeat Empty Hand. As Thomas Wayne attempts to sedate Doctor Multiverse, he is now possessed by the Great Darkness causing Darkseid to kill him and take Doctor Multiverse's energy with him before teleporting to Earth-7. As the heroes try to intervene, the possessed members attack them under the influence of the Empty Hand which Doctor Multiverse frees them. The Empty Hand manages to overpower Darkseid allowing him to activate the Oblivion Machine and lure Darkseid into the dark void. With Orion now the ruler of Apokolips, he decided to destroy Oblivion Machine which the Justice Incarnate continues to rescue Barry Allen. The heroes enter the void only to discover that Barry is trapped in the twisted reality. As they tried to convince Barry to leave, he refused. Pariah suddenly appears and tries to persuade them of their desire but Doctor Multiverse knows his deception and forced the team to retreat. As Orion departed to Apokolips, Thunderer summons his powers to destroy the Machine decimating Earth-7 in the process before evacuating with the team. Having failed to rescue Barry and the multiverse in jeopardy, the Justice League Incarnate decides to summon Barry's Justice League for aid. Somewhere in the Void, Pariah revealed to Darkseid that despite the Justice League Incarnate's success in closing the portal, both Multiverse-1 and 2 were weakened allowing the Great Darkness to take control of Darkseid and submit him to its will creating its own Dark Army alongside Ares, Doomsday, Eclipso, Nekron, Neron, Empty Hand, and Upside Down Man.

Black Adam, Batman, Wonder Woman, Hawkgirl, Superman, Zatanna, Aquaman, John Stewart, Martian Manhunter, Black Canary, and Green Arrow are transported into the House of Heroes (headquarters of the Justice League Incarnate) where it's revealed that Calvin Ellis teleported them because Barry Allen is trapped in a twisted reality and the Great Darkness has enslaved Darkseid and killed Spectre. Wonder Woman explains her discussion with The Hands about the cost to the team. Arriving at Multiverse-1 ruins after the attack, The team is encountered by Pariah who is now under influence of the Darkness. Superman offered Pariah aid to absolve his mistakes but Pariah rejects their help believing that the heroes ruined everything. He claims that he will let the Justice League's world die for the true Multiverse to be reborn. Pariah summons the Dark Army, with Spectre and the Anti-Monitor's shadow demons as their allies, to fight against the Justice League and Justice League Incarnate. During the battle, the Justice League was surprised at how brutal they were and discovered that they were all possessed by the Great Darkness. The battle ends when Green Arrow shoots his arrow to destroy Pariah's machine before being pummeled by Doomsday. Enraged by their interference, Pariah summons his power to erase both the Justice League and Justice League Incarnate from existence. During a battle with Pariah, Black Adam manages to escape and lands in front of the Hall of Justice, saying the Justice League is dead.

After Talia al Ghul killed Deathstroke, his army put his body in the Lazarus Pits where Deathstroke is revived and tells everyone that he will kill everyone.

Jon Kent meets up with Nightwing and reports to him about the Justice League's death from Black Adam. Nightwing and Jon Kent discuss how heroes that die are usually resurrected, and they decide to team up to honor their mentors' legacy. Wally West, Iris West, Linda Park, and Wallace West discuss Barry's disappearance and Wally promises Iris that he will find him. After his hero duties with Wallace, Wally revisits the Flash museum honoring heroes' sacrifices before receiving the call from Jon. Hal Jordan learns from Aquaman (Jackson Hyde) about the Leagues' death before escorting the corrupted alien to its home after being cured. Taking place before the Justice League's death, Pariah wanders endlessly in the false reality while facing his guilt until he discovered the reality of multiverse-2 destruction, unaware that the Great Darkness manipulates him into building the machine. Noctura encounters Stephanie Brown at the museum and understood the loss of Batman until she was persuaded to join the Secret Society of Super Villains.

Plot
Nightwing gives a eulogy to the Justice League in front of the rest of the superhero community and the general public, while Deathstroke and his Secret Society of Super Villains also pay their respects as he blows out the candle. As villains spread chaos across the world out of fear, Hal Jordan arrives and is shocked to hear from Jon Kent and Wally West that the Justice League was killed by Pariah according to Black Adam, and doesn't trust Black Adam's word. Wally West tells him that Doctor Fate, Ray Palmer, Ryan Choi, and Captain Cold don't know where the Justice League and Barry Allen are. With Hal Jordan departing for galactic threat and Wally West leaving to find Barry, Jon Kent tries persuading Yara Flor (the Brazilian Wonder Girl) and Jace Fox (the new Batman of New York) to join his new Justice League, but they refuse due to them being busy. Jon Kent creates his new Justice League (Damian Wayne, Supergirl, a female Doctor Light, Blue Beetle, Booster Gold, Ted Kord, Harley Quinn, Killer Frost, Jackson Hyde, and Frankenstein), to which Black Adam tells Jon that his Justice League is not ready because some of the members are reformed villains. Deathstroke and his army launch an attack on the Titans Academy, injuring many superheroes and shooting Beast Boy in the head. On Multiverse-2, Pariah reveals his plan to the Great Darkness by using the Justice League's death to incite Earth-0 into deep despair, allowing him to excess his phase of destroying the multiverse.

Nightwing manages to recover from the attack and confronts Deathstroke who reveals that his army has already targeted Nightwing's closest allies. Deathstroke challenges Nightwing to a fight which Nightwing wins, but Deathstroke offers a second challenger and Nightwing realizes that Deathstroke will kill the person who loses him in a fight. Nightwing offers himself up but is saved by Jon Kent. Deathstroke also sends in Cyborg Superman to take down Jon Kent, but Jon Kent defeats Cyborg Superman. Pariah tells Deathstroke to spare the heroes and orders him to retreat bringing his Secret Society with him, which he relents. Black Adam arrives and announces that he will be training the new Justice League. Kyle Rayner escapes from prison and meets up with Hal Jordan and the Green Lantern Corps (Jo Mullein, Kilowog, Guy Gardner, Simon Baz, and Jessica Cruz), where he learns that Wally West, Kid Flash, Jesse Chambers, Max Mercury, and Wally's kids are trying to find Barry Allen.

As Donna Troy discusses the aftermath of Titans Academy's incident, Deathstroke's army tries to capture more heroes while the public starts to lose hope that the Justice League will return forcing other heroes to make difficult choices. Barbara Gordon, Duke Thomas, Jason Todd, Stephanie Brown and Cassandra Cain go visit the Titans tower to make sure Nightwing is okay after the attack while checking on Beast Boy. Black Adam is trying to train the new Justice League and convinces them they must kill their enemies to scare Deathstroke, but they disapprove of his actions believing that killing them will not justify their victory. Damian Wayne confirms that Deathstroke is well aware of their moral views of killing. Yara Flor arrives and stops Black Adam from killing Count Vertigo in front of the Justice League forcing Black Adam to leave in humiliation and ask the Legion of Doom for help. Deathstroke reunites with Ravager and persuades her to be her legacy as the Darkness infested his Secret Society to start a crisis. As Jon Kent and Damian Wayne argue about their loss of hope, the Justice Society of America arrives to help the new Justice League. Meanwhile, Hal Jordan and the Green Lantern Corps arrive at Planet Ryut of sector 666 using Nekron's old central power battery that allows Hal, Kyle, and Mullein to teleport toward Multiverse-2, leaving other Green Lanterns to prepare for the upcoming battle. As the three Green Lanterns confront Pariah on Multiverse-2's ruin, Hal Jordan discovers the Great Darkness' plan of using the Justice League's death to weaponize them and recreating new pocket dimensions before being disintegrated and transported to the pocket world of John Stewart.

Barry Allen arrives and saves Hal Jordan, revealing that Wally West rescued him from Pariah's mind control and choose to rescue the Justice League after learning about their death and examining their alternate worlds. Barry tells Hal that Pariah is using the Justice League's prisons to harness energy to power a bomb and takes him to Batman's prison. As the Justice League and Justice Society discuss the Great Darkness' threat, Alan Scott manages to persuade Nightwing to lead the new team by stating they need his new leadership since he was the original sidekick who went out of his mentor's shadow. Nightwing, Yara Flor, Alan Scott, and Jon Kent visit the Justice League Dark's headquarters owned by John Constantine, Detective Chimp, and two avatars of Swamp Thing (Alec Holland and Levi Kamei) where they tell the heroes that the Great Darkness is not a benevolent or malevolent force, and someone is corrupting it. Deathstroke attacks the Legion of Doom's headquarters and a fight breaks out. Lex Luthor manages to disarm Deathstroke, but is attacked by infected Prometheus, who manages to take control of the Legion of Doom and attacks Black Adam, with Pariah revealing that he plans to use the energy from the Justice League worlds to create a new Multiverse as he retells its origin.

Black Adam is saved by Sideways, Mister Terrific, Jackson Hyde, and Supergirl from the possessed Legion of Doom, and Mister Terrific realizes that Deathstroke's army spreads The Great Darkness influence over people, and Jon Kent reveals that Pariah is corrupting the Great Darkness. Damian Wayne tells Doctor Light to follow him as he has a secret plan while Nightwings prepares the Titans to fight against Deathstroke's army despite Black Adam's complaint. Flash and Green Lantern manage to free Batman and Wonder Woman from their imprisonment. As they rescue Superman, who is fully aware of his prison world. He reveals to them that he managed to break free of his prison after studying his alternate reality allowing him to absorb the crisis energy. Desperate to recreate the worlds, Pariah discovers that the infinite Earths are unstable and he requires more heroes to stabilize them. Imbued with cosmic powers, Superman manages to free all of the Justice League members, including the revived Green Arrow, as they confront Pariah. Pariah disappears back to Earth-Zero where he attacks the rest of Earth's heroes with Deathstroke's Secret Society and his Dark Army.

The Shadow Demons quickly ambush the Green Lantern Corps as they flush out from the central power battery, while the heroes on Earth are overwhelmed by Pariah's Dark army. As Pariah laments his desire toward the Great Darkness, Deathstroke pleads with Pariah to end this pain, and Pariah states Deathstroke will be freed after he succeeded in Darkness' mission before confronting Nightwing and a recovered Beast Boy. Jace Fox arrives to help the heroes on Earth alongside Miss Martian, Blue Beetle, Connor Hawke, Nubia, and Steel. Pariah vaporizes Steel, Ted Kord, Firestorm, Booster Gold, and Connor Hawke, which recreates more worlds to allow the Great Darkness to overrun the Multiverse. Yara Flor uses her Lasso of Truth on Pariah long enough for Jace Fox and Mister Terrific to use Pariah's machine on him, killing him in the process. Overpowered by the combined strength of Darkseid, Eclipso, Ares, Nekron, Doomsday, and Neron, Jonathan Samuel Kent is about to accept his fate until he was joined with Superman, alongside with the Justice League and the Green Lantern Corps, who manages to arrive back home thanks to Hal Jordan and Barry Allen's combination of the speed force and the power ring (although Green Arrow is killed once again, since he wasn't vaporized by Pariah). The heroes manage to gain the upper hand on the Dark Army. However, the Great Darkness chooses Deathstroke as its final host, causing him to mutate into a Doomsday-like monstrosity. The now-insane Deathstroke prepares to kill Nightwing and Ravager as he declares that he intends not to control the Multiverse, but to destroy it instead.

As the Justice League tries to fight off Deathstroke, Nightwing and Deathstroke fight in their minds with Deathstroke explaining he wants to destroy the Multiverse to break the cycle of villains rising again and causing everyone to suffer as a result. Damian Wayne brings in the Justice League Incarnate as well as Doctor Light who reveals she is connected to the DC Multiverse just like The Great Darkness. As the Justice League fend off the Great Darkness, Doctor Light combines her power with the Speed Force that The Flash has charged up to repel the Great Darkness from the DC Multiverse becoming more infinite. As Doctor Light and the speedsters successfully healed the multiverse, the Dark Army vanished pulling back from where they came from while the heroes who were erased by Pariah were restored from their deaths. Black Adam gives his powers to the rest of the heroes while weakening Deathstroke but the Great Darkness chooses Nightwing as its new host. Nightwing manages to fight off the Great Darkness influence and knocks out Deathstroke before he could kill Black Adam, and Ravager convinces Deathstroke to stop. As the rest of the heroes reunited with their family and celebrated their victory for saving the multiverse, Deathstroke loses his Super Soldier serum due to the Great Darkness corrupting him, Spectre reconnected with Jim Corrigan along with the restored quintessences, Darkseid returns to Apokolips regaining his leadership, Dr Light exploring the multiverse under Justice League Incarnate supervision, Canary and Arsenal mourns Oliver Queen's death, and members of the Legion of Doom and the Secret Society escaped from chaos and plot their next schemes. With the Great Darkness laid in rest, the heroes concluded that Pariah was never really corrupted by the Great Darkness but it was all in his head. Barry Allen decided to investigate the multiverse for upcoming threat with Wallace West while Hal Jordan rejoins with the Green Lantern Corps for their mission. Superman and Jonathan Samuel Kent thank Black Adam for his help, and Black Adam begrudgingly compliments Jonathan Samuel Kent. While meeting up with Nightwing, Batman announces the Justice League are disbanded because of their experiences and decides that every hero will work together before hearing a call. In the epilogue, Amanda Waller and her Suicide Squads meets up with The Light to try to convince them to eradicate all metahumans.

Tie-ins

Aquamen
After Jackson Hyde, Mera, and Garth defeat Black Manta, they hear that the Justice League was killed. Jackson goes to Mera to console her.

Dark Crisis: The Big Bang
After the final battle, the restoration of the infinite Multiverse led to the return of the Anti-Monitor. The Anti-Monitor once again attempted to destroy the Multiverse, but he was foiled by Barry Allen, Wallace West and a team of Multiversal heroes.

Dark Crisis: The Dark Army
Damian Wayne leads Sideways, Power Girl, Doctor Light, and Red Canary to Earth 53 to find a way to prevent The Great Darkness from taking over more heroes and Earths. They are ambushed by Justice League Incarnate, but Doctor Light frees them thanks to her powers, and they head back to their homeworld.

Dark Crisis: War Zone
Linda Park helps save Iris West while revealing she has super-speed, and they hold off the villains until the Justice League arrives. Meanwhile, Jim Corrigan is separated from The Spectre. With the help of Raven, he merges with the Spectre again. Nubia has a vision where Deathstroke and his army will cause Dark Crisis in Themiscyra. When the Justice League arrive on Earth, the Green Lanterns manage to repel the Great Darkness. During the climatic battle, Damian Wayne belittles Red Canary. With the help of Black Canary, Cassandra Cain and Stephanie Brown, Red Canary regains her confidence and helps defeat some villains.

The Flash
Mister Terrific asks Wally West, Wallace West, Jay Garrick, Jesse Chambers, and Max Mercury to help save Barry Allen by going into the Speed Force and finding Barry's vibrations. Linda Park meets up with Wally and is about to tell him that she has powers when their kids Irey and Jai West go into the Speed Force portal that Mister Terrific opened. Irey and Jai West, as well as Max Mercury and Jesse Quick land on two different worlds while Wally and Wallace West land on Barry's prison world. Max Mercury and Jesse Quick land on an Earth where Barry is not a speedster and is in an apocalyptic world while Irey and Jai West land on an Earth where they escape from a speedster Night-Flash (an amalgamation of Batman and Flash). Wally tries talking to Barry Allen, but Barry sees Eobard Thawne instead due to the prison world and nearly kills him.

Linda Park manages to persuade Mister Terrific to let her go in the Speed Force after waiting for a long time and punches Barry before he could kill Wally. Wallace West is nearly tricked to stay in the Prison World but snaps out of it. Jay Garrick arrives to take Irey and Jai West home, and all the speedsters rendezvous at Barry's prison world, with Barry realizing that the Justice League are alive and they're trapped in prison worlds like he was when he encountered Pariah. The rest of the speedsters return to Earth while Barry Allen goes out to try to free the rest of the Justice League before rejoining them.

Young Justice
Tim Drake, Arrowette, Cassie Sandsmark, Bart Allen, and Conner Kent set up statues after Nightwing's speech in Dark Crisis #1. While talking in a table, Tim Drake, Conner Kent, and Bart are suddenly transported into different worlds where Tim sees Alfred Pennyworth again, Connor sees Dubbilex, and Bart meets up with Max Mercury. Cassie tries asking Wally West, Nightwing, and Jonathan Samuel Kent but they don't know where they are. The trio meet up with each other on Happy Harbor (first headquarters of the Justice League) where they are confronted by a female villain name The Mighty Endowed but an alternate version of Cassie saves them.

Cassie manages to convince Arrowette to help her, and they track down Red Volcano and Red Tornado. Connor, Tim, Bart, and alternate Cassie go to Metropolis to fight Tora where they realize something's not right with this world. They go to the Justice League headquarters where they debate whether they should stay in the prison world. When they go back to Happy Harbor, they see Lex Luthor, Deathstroke, and Captain Boomerang.

I Am Batman
Sinestro, under orders of Pariah and Deathstroke, tries to torture Jace Fox (the new Batman) and have Jace get the Yellow Lantern ring. This fails when Jace Fox sees through Sinestro's illusions, and decides to go help the Justice League fight against Pariah's Great darkness enemy.

Superman: Kal-El Returns Special
After defeating Mongul's son and talking to Lois, Superman returns to the Hall of Justice and meets Naomi McDuffie, Wally West, and Martian Manhunter. They bond and talk about their recent's adventures when Superman is teleported by the Justice League Incarnate to help them deal with Pariah and his army.

Dark Crisis: Worlds Without a Justice League

Superman
Superman is trapped in a world where he has to deal with his son Jon Kent growing up and being independent.

Wonder Woman
Wonder Woman is trapped in a world where Etta Candy is president of the United States and Artemis of Bana-Mighdall didn't murder her mother, Queen Hippolyta. She encounters Doctor Psycho who is held captive by the Amazons.

Batman
Batman is trapped in a world where his Bruce Wayne persona is separated by Alfred because Alfred wants Bruce and Batman to be happy. Meanwhile, Zatanna is trapped in a world, but is freed by Zatara, John Constantine, Aquaman, Batman, Superman, Flash, Hal Jordan, and Wonder Woman.

Green Lantern
John Stewart is transported to a world where John helps fight off an enemy called The Radiant Dead who killed Guardians of the Universe. Meanwhile, Kendra Saunders is trying to enter the Temple of Life to break her reincarnation cycle to be her own person.

Green Arrow
Green Arrow is in a world where he is Robin Hood alongside Connor Hawke, Roy Harper, and Mia Dearden trying to fight Merlyn, who is the Sheriff of Nottingham. Green Arrow is attacked by Black Canary, but they stop fighting in order to get to know each other. While at a club, they are attacked by an alternate version of Oliver Queen who never left the island, but Black Canary saves Green Arrow and they kiss, revealing that no matter what world they are in, they will always be soulmates.

Issues involved

Prelude issues

Main series

Tie-in issues

Critical reception
According to Comic Book Roundup, Dark Crisis has a score of 8.1 out of 10 based on 131 reviews. However, the Dark Crisis: Young Justice tie-in had received some criticism for the writing and uncharacteristic behavior of the characters.

References

Comics set on fictional planets
DC Comics titles
2022 in comics
Storylines in comics